= Kashedi Ghat =

- Interactive map of Kashedi Ghat

Third Approach
- Location: Maharashtra, India
- Range: Sahyadri

Kashedi Ghat is a mountain pass in India located on the Mumbai - Goa - Kanyakumari National Highway 66 (India). This ghat is near Poladpur, on the Mahad to Khed section. It has a deadly curve, which make it one of the difficult ghats in Maharashtra.
